Abbotsford ferry wharf is located on the southern side of the Parramatta River serving the Sydney suburb of Abbotsford. It served by Sydney Ferries Parramatta River services operating between Circular Quay and Parramatta. The single wharf is served by RiverCat class ferries.

History
A wharf at the present site was the southern end of Bedlam's Ferry, which existed from at least 1834. It was part of the historic route of the Great North Road (New South Wales), which continued on the north bank from Bedlam Point Wharf. An upgrade of the ferry wharf was completed in 2018.

Wharves & services

Interchanges
Transit Systems operates one bus route to and from Abbotsford wharf:
438X/438N: to Martin Place

References

External links

Abbotsford Wharf at Transport for New South Wales (Archived 11 June 2019)
Abbotsford Local Area Map Transport for NSW

Ferry wharves in Sydney